The Pirates of the Baltic Sea or The Pirates of the Baltic Sea Resorts (German:Die Piraten der Ostseebäder) is a 1927 German silent mystery film directed by and starring Valy Arnheim. Arnheim played the role of the detective Harry Hill, one of several films in which the character appeared.

The film's sets were designed by the art director Willi Herrmann.

Cast
 Valy Arnheim as Harry Hill, Detektiv  
 Marga Lindt 
 Hilde Maroff 
 Fritz Kampers 
 Harry Bender 
 Bobbie Bender 
 Maria Forescu
 Paul Morgan 
 Karl Victor Plagge 
 Rudolf Lettinger
 Karl Falkenberg 
 Gerd Briese

References

External links

1927 films
Films of the Weimar Republic
Films directed by Valy Arnheim
German silent feature films
Films set in the Baltic Sea
German mystery films
1927 mystery films
German black-and-white films
Silent mystery films
1920s German films